North Sydney Bus Charters is an Australian bus company operating charter services in Sydney.

History
North Sydney Bus Charters was founded in July 2002 by Scott Riley to service his Tennis World business at Chatswood, Lane Cove, North Ryde and North Sydney.

It then commenced a contract for Lane Cove Council operating two routes from the Mars Road industrial estate, Lane Cove West to Lane Cove Plaza with two Mercedes-Benz LO812s. The service was discontinued on 21 September 2009.

On 4 May 2009, it commenced trial operation of the Artarmon Loop service for Willoughby Council from St Leonards station through the industrial area of Artarmon and back via the Pacific Highway and Royal North Shore Hospital.

Today it operates services under contract for a number of private schools on the North Shore.

Expansion has occurred through the purchase of the Concord Coaches, Ocean View Coaches and Voyager Coaches businesses. In May 2016 Bankstown Coaches was purchased with 44 vehicles.

Fleet
As at February 2020, the fleet consisted of 137 buses and coaches.

References

Bus companies of New South Wales
Bus transport in Sydney
Transport companies established in 2002
2002 establishments in Australia